Edgar Burcksen (born 13 May 1947, Apeldoorn), is a Dutch film editor, who moved to the United States in 1985 after editing over 15 films in the Netherlands. He is a member of the American Cinema Editors and is fluent in English, German, French and Dutch.

History 
After  a successful career as a film editor in The Netherlands, he settled in California, where he became the supervising editor for 52 episodes of "Seabert", a French cartoon that later became televised by HBO. Afterwards, Burcksen was hired by Colossal Pictures where he collaborated editorially on many commercials, including those for Disney, Budweiser, and Levi's. 

Burcksen was hired by ILM in 1989 to become the visual effects editor on The Hunt for Red October. Based on his success, he was later assigned to post production on Die Hard 2. Afterwards, Burcksen oversaw editing on "The Young Indiana Jones Chronicles". His work with George Lucas on the series earned him an Emmy for best editing in 1992.

After the series, he became editor and post production supervisor on "500 Nations" and Star Command. In 1996 he was signed up to edit Colors Straight Up, which was later nominated for best feature-length documentary at the Oscars the following year. His collaboration with director Jeroen Krabbé on the feature "Left Luggage" was received with 4 prestigious awards at the Berlin Film Festival in 1998. 

Burcksen has been elected as a member of the American Cinema Editors, and is currently a member of its board of directors. From 2001 to 2010, Edgar Burcksen was editor-in-chief of CINEMAEDITOR—the official magazine of the ACE. 

In February 2011, the American Cinema Editors honored Burcksen with the Robert Wise Award for his tireless efforts to highlight the post-production process of film and television projects in his role as editor-in-chief of CINEMAEDITOR.

References

External links 

Coal Queens Bio

1947 births
Living people
Dutch film editors
American Cinema Editors
People from Apeldoorn
American film editors